Marie Waldron (born March 28, 1988) is an American politician from California. Waldron is currently a member of the California State Assembly, and served as the Assembly minority leader from 2018 until 2022. Waldron is a Republican member of the California State Assembly and represents District 75, encompassing parts of inland central and eastern San Diego County,including Ramona, Poway, Santee, and Alpine.

Early life and education 
Waldron was born in New York City, New York. She earned a Bachelor of Science degree in Athletic Administration and Communications from St. John's University. Waldron attended San Diego State University and the University of California, San Diego.

Career 
A business owner, Waldron owns Waldron Enterprises LLC and Top End Tees Screenprinting & Driving Styles Apparel. Waldron's political career began when she became member of the Escondido City Council. In 2002, Waldron served as a Vice Mayor until 2005. Waldron served the city council until 2012.

On November 6, 2012, Waldron won the election and became a Republican member of California State Assembly for District 75. Waldron defeated Matthew Herold with 62.7% of the votes. On November 4, 2014, as an incumbent, Waldron won the election and continued serving District 75. Waldron defeated Nicholas Shestople with 69% of the votes. On November 8, 2016, as an incumbent, Waldron won the election and continued serving District 75. Waldron defeated Andrew Masiel Sr. with 62.9% of the votes. On November 6, 2018, as an incumbent, Waldron won the election and continued serving District 75. Waldron defeated Alan Geraci with 56.4% of the votes.

On November 8, 2018, she was elected by her Assembly Republican colleagues to serve as Assembly minority leader.

In 2022, redistricting combined her district with that of fellow Assemblyman Randy Voepel.  Waldron won by a wide margin.

Waldron is a founding member of the San Diego chapter of California Women's Leadership Association known as CWLA.

Election history

2014 California State Assembly

2016 California State Assembly

2018 California State Assembly

2020 California State Assembly

2022 California State Assembly

Personal life 
Waldron lives in Valley Center, California.

References

External links 
 Marie Waldron at ballotpedia.org
 Marie Waldron at ourcampaigns.com
 Campaign website
 Assemblywoman Marie Waldron
 Join California Marie Waldron

21st-century American politicians
21st-century American women politicians
California city council members
Living people
Republican Party members of the California State Assembly
People from Escondido, California
Place of birth missing (living people)
Women city councillors in California
Women state legislators in California
Women opposition leaders
1960 births